Choreography is the art or practice of designing sequences of movements of physical bodies (or their depictions) in which motion or form or both are specified. Choreography may also refer to the design itself. A choreographer is one who creates choreographies by practising the art of choreography, a process known as choreographing. It most commonly refers to dance choreography.

In dance, choreography may also refer to the design itself, which is sometimes expressed by means of dance notation. Dance choreography is sometimes called dance composition. Aspects of dance choreography include the compositional use of organic unity, rhythmic or non-rhythmic articulation, theme and variation, and repetition. The choreographic process may employ improvisation for the purpose of developing innovative movement ideas. In general, choreography is used to design dances that are intended to be performed as concert dance.

The art of choreography involves the specification of human movement and form in terms of space, shape, time and energy, typically within an emotional or non-literal context. Movement language is taken from the dance techniques of ballet, contemporary dance, jazz dance, hip hop dance, folk dance, techno, K-pop, religious dance, pedestrian movement, or combinations of these.

Etymology and history

The word choreography literally means "dance-writing" from the Greek words "χορεία" (circular dance, see choreia) and "γραφή" (writing). It first appeared in the American English dictionary in the 1950s, and "choreographer" was first used as a credit for George Balanchine in the Broadway show On Your Toes in 1936.  Before this, stage credits and movie credits used phrases such as "ensembles staged by", "dances staged by", or simply "dances by" to denote the choreographer.

In Renaissance Italy, dance masters created movements for social dances which were taught, while staged ballets were created in a similar way. In 16th century France, French court dances were developed in an artistic pattern. In the 17th and 18th centuries, social dance became more separated from theatrical dance performances. During this time the word choreography was applied to the written record of dances, which later became known as dance notation, with the meaning of choreography shifting to its current use as the composition of a sequence of movements making up a dance performance.

The ballet master or choreographer during this time became the "arranger of dance as a theatrical art", with one well-known master being of the late 18th century being Jean-Georges Noverre, with others following and developing techniques for specific types of dance, including Gasparo Angiolini, Jean Dauberval, Charles Didelot, and Salvatore Viganò. Ballet eventually developed its own vocabulary in the 19th century, and romantic ballet choreographers included   Carlo Blasis, August Bournonville, Jules Perrot and Marius Petipa.

Modern dance brought a new, more naturalistic style of choreography, including by Russian choreographer Michel Fokine (1880-1942) and Isadora Duncan (1878-1927), and since then styles have varied between realistic representation and abstraction. Merce Cunningham, George Balanchine, and Sir Frederick Ashton were all influential choreographers of classical or abstract dance, but Balanchine and Ashton, along with Martha Graham, Leonide Massine, Jerome Robbins and others also created representational works. Isadora Duncan loved natural movement and improvisation. The work of Alvin Ailey (1931-1989), an African-American dancer, choreographer, and activist, spanned many styles of dance, including ballet, jazz, modern dance, and theatre.

Dance choreography techniques
Dances are designed by applying one or both of these fundamental choreographic methods:
 Improvisation, in which a choreographer provides dancers with a score (i.e., generalized directives) that serves as guidelines for improvised movement and form. For example, a score might direct one dancer to withdraw from another dancer, who in turn is directed to avoid the withdrawal, or it might specify a sequence of movements that are to be executed in an improvised manner over the course of a musical phrase, as in contra dance choreography. Improvisational scores typically offer wide latitude for personal interpretation by the dancer.
 Planned choreography, in which a choreographer dictates motion and form in detail, leaving little or no opportunity for the dancer to exercise personal interpretation.

Several underlying techniques are commonly used in choreography for two or more dancers:
 Mirroring - facing each other and doing the same
 Retrograde - performing a sequence of moves in reverse order
 Canon - people performing the same move one after the other
 Levels - people higher and lower in a dance
 Shadowing - standing one behind the other and performing the same moves
 Unison - two or more people doing a range of moves at the same time

Movements may be characterized by dynamics, such as fast, slow, hard, soft, long, and short.

Choreography today
Today, the main rules for choreography are that it must impose some kind of order on the performance, within the three dimensions of space as well the fourth dimension of time and the capabilities of the human body.

In the performing arts, choreography applies to human movement and form. In dance, choreography is also known as dance choreography or dance composition. Choreography is also used in a variety of other fields, including opera,
cheerleading,  theatre, marching band, synchronized swimming, cinematography, ice skating, gymnastics, fashion shows,   show choir,  cardistry, video game production, and animated art.

Competitions

The International Choreographic Competition Hannover, Hanover, Germany, is the longest-running choreography competition in the world (started ), organised by the Ballett Gesellschaft Hannover e.V. It took place online during the COVID-19 pandemic in 2020 and 2021, returning to the stage at the Theater am Aegi in 2022. Gregor Zöllig, head choreographer of dance at the Staatstheater Braunschweig was appointed artistic director of the competition in 2020. The main conditions of entry are that entrants must be under 40 years of age, and professionally trained. The competition has been run in collaboration with the Tanja Liedtke Foundation since her death in 2008, and from 2021 a new production prize has been awarded by the foundation, to complement the five other production awards. The 2021 and 2022 awards were presented by Marco Goecke, then director of ballet at the Staatstheater Hannover.

There are a number of other international choreography competitions, mostly focused on modern dance. These include:
Beijing International Ballet and Choreography Competition, Beijing, China
Contemporary Dance Platform, Cyprus, Greece
Copenhagen International Choreography Competition, Copenhagen, Denmark (CICC), founded in 2008, annual 
Helsinki Ballet Competition, Choreography Award, Helsinki, Finland
International Choreographic Competition, Rome, Italy
Moscow Ballet Competition and Contest for Choreographers, Moscow, Russia
New Adventures Choreographer Award, London, UK
Prix de la Danse de Montreal, Montreal, Canada
Valentina Kozlova International Ballet Competition, Brussels, Belgium
Varna International Ballet Competition, Choreography Award, Varna, Bulgaria

The International Online Dance Competition (IODC) was introduced in 2020 in response to the COVID-19 pandemic, with a Grand Prix worth .

See also
 Ballet master
 Contact improvisation
 Dance improvisation
Film editing
List of choreographers
List of dance awards#Choreography
Movement director
 Stage Directors and Choreographers Society
Lists and categories
 :Category:Ballet choreographers
 List of choreographers

References

Further reading 
 Blom, L, A. and Tarin Chaplin, L. (1989) The Intimate Act of Choreography. Dance Books. .
 Ellfeldt, L. (1998) A Primer for Choreographers . Waveland Press. .
 Minton, S, C. (1997) Choreography: A Basic Approach Using Improvisation. Human Kinetics . .
 Tufnell, M. and Vaughan, D. (1999) Body Space Image : Notes Toward Improvisation and Performance. Princeton Book Co. .
 Smith-Autard, J, M. (2000) Dance Composition. Routledge. .

External links

 
Performing arts